Brad Hawkins (born January 13, 1976) is an American actor, best known for playing Ryan Steele in Saban's action adventure science fantasy series VR Troopers (1994–1996, and with 92 total episode appearances) and for his role in the 2014 film Boyhood. He also provided the (uncredited) voice of Trey of Triforia, the Gold Ranger in Power Rangers Zeo. In 1999, he starred as Tyler Hart in the CBS miniseries Shake, Rattle and Roll: An American Love Story, filmed in North Carolina (Charlotte and Mooresville). 

Before becoming an actor, he attended Plano Senior High School in Plano, Texas, graduating in 1992. He was a country music singer for three years in Nashville. His country song "We Lose" became a No. 1 video hit on Country Music Television and Great American Country country music television channels. He starred in the slasher film Shredder in 2003. His most recent acting role was as a motion capture actor for id Software's Doom 2016. He also works as a voice actor, often with Funimation, including roles in D.Gray-man, Dragonaut: The Resonance, and Goblin Slayer.

Discography

Singles

Music videos

Filmography

Anime
 A Certain Scientific Railgun – Wataru Kurozuma
 Black Clover – Lotus Whomalt
 Blassreiter – Igor
 D.Gray-man – Tyki Mikk
 Dragonaut: The Resonance – Howlingstar
 Fairy Tail – Bloodman
 Fullmetal Alchemist: Brotherhood – Yakovlev
 Future Diary – Marco Ikusaba (7th)
 Goblin Slayer – Goblin Slayer
 Joker Game – Amari
 My Hero Academia – Shikkui Makabe
 One Piece – Vigaro, Diamante (Funimation dub)
 Trigun: Badlands Rumble – Nicholas D. Wolfwood

Live-action
 Step by Step – Chuck
 VR Troopers – Ryan Steele
 Shake, Rattle and Roll: An American Love Story – Tyler Hart
 Prison Break – Tough Guy No. 2, Cop No. 2
 Monk – Kurt Wolff (Season 3 Episode 'Mr. Monk and the Panic Room') 
 Charmed – Vassen
 CSI: Crime Scene Investigation – Tough Guy No. 2, Cop No. 2; Justin Mack (Season 4 Episode 'Turn of the Screws')
 Hope Ranch – Ajax
 The Good Guys – TV Stark
 Chase – SOG Marshall Barnes
 Wire in the Blood – Darius Grady
 Continuum (web series) – Tipton
 Boyhood – Jim

Voice over
 Power Rangers Zeo – Trey of Triforia/Gold Ranger

Video games
 Comic Jumper: The Adventures of Captain Smiley – Brad (vocals)

References

External links

1976 births
Living people
American male film actors
American male television actors
American male video game actors
American male voice actors
American martial artists
Male actors from Dallas
21st-century American male actors
20th-century American male actors
People from Carrollton, Texas